James Skinner (by 1489 – 30 July 1558), of Reigate, Surrey, was an English politician.

He was a Member (MP) of the Parliament of England for Reigate in 1542 and November 1554.

References

15th-century births
1558 deaths
People from Surrey
English MPs 1542–1544
English MPs 1554–1555